Cotherstone is a village and civil parish in the Pennine hills, in Teesdale, County Durham, England.
Cotherstone lies within the historic county boundaries of the North Riding of Yorkshire, but along with the rest of the former Startforth Rural District it was transferred to County Durham for administrative and ceremonial purposes on 1 April 1974, under the provisions of the Local Government Act 1972.

There was a railway station at Cotherstone on the now-closed Barnard Castle to Middleton-in-Teesdale line. The railway line crossed the River Balder at the Balder Viaduct just north of Cotherstone.

Cotherstone cheese is a celebrated delicacy, and the village was famous for it by at least 1858.

Notable people
Hannah Hauxwell, who became famous through a 1970s Yorkshire Television documentary, farmed near Cotherstone and in 1988 moved to the village itself.

In 1973 Maxwell Fry and his wife Jane Drew, both modernist architects, retired to Cotherstone.

The jurist John Cyril Smith was born in the village in 1922.

Miles Stapleton was a notable Lord of Cotherstone (among other places) during the fourteenth century.

John Bowes bred four winners of The Derby at nearby Streatlam Castle, including Cotherstone.

Bentley Beetham, the mountaineer, ornithologist and photographer retired here in 1949. He was a member of the 1924 British Mount Everest Expedition.

References

External links

Villages in County Durham